is a Japanese footballer who plays as a winger for Kaya–Iloilo of the Philippines Football League (PFL).

Club career

Albirex Niigata (S)
After graduating from Tokai University, Horikoshi signed for Albirex Niigata Singapore of the Singapore Premier League (SPL) for their 2019 season. He started in the 2019 Singapore Community Shield, where they lost to Home United, 5–4 on penalties. He scored the opening goal on their 2–1 away league win over Warriors FC on 13 April.

Kaya–Iloilo
In February 2020, it was announced that Horikoshi had signed for Kaya–Iloilo of the Philippines Football League (PFL). He scored his first goal for the club on 7 November 2021 in their Copa Paulino Alcantara opening match, a 2–0 win over the Azkals Development Team. He was named the man of the match that night. Kaya went on to win the 2021 Copa Paulino Alcantara.

Horikoshi was the top goalscorer in the 2022 Copa Paulino Alcantara with six goals in the tournament, earning him the Golden Boot award. Kaya finished as the competition's runners-up.

Career statistics

Club

Honours
Kaya–Iloilo
Copa Paulino Alcantara: 2021; runner-up: 2022

Individual
Copa Paulino Alcantara Golden Boot: 2022

References

1996 births
Living people
Association football forwards
Japanese footballers
Japanese expatriate footballers
Expatriate footballers in Singapore
Japanese expatriate sportspeople in Singapore
Tokai University alumni
Albirex Niigata Singapore FC players
Singapore Premier League players